Aviamotornaya is a station on the Bolshaya Koltsevaya line of the Moscow Metro. The station was opened on 27 March 2020 as part of Nekrasovskaya line extension.

Similar to Aviamotornaya on the Kalininsko-Solntsevskaya line, that station's name comes from Aviamotornaya Ulitsa, which, in turn, is named for the Baranov Central Institute of Aviation Motor Development.

Construction
In July 2016, the Lefortovo market was cleared in order to begin construction on the station. Construction on the north lobby began in February 2017. Tunneling began in September 2017 starting with the left tunnel, followed by the right tunnel in October of that year.

Layout
The station has two lobbies, one that exits to Aviamotornaya Ulitsa with a second at Proyezd Entuziastov. It is part of a transit hub that allows transfers to the existing Aviamotornaya station as well as the Novaya stop on the Kazanskoye branch of the Moscow Railway. In addition, there is a commercial component for vendors that previously had space in the now-demolished market.

References

Moscow Metro stations
Railway stations in Russia opened in 2020
Bolshaya Koltsevaya line